The New Zealand Opera Company was New Zealand's first resident professional national company,  formed by baritone Donald Munro in 1954. Its first full-scale work was Mozart's Marriage of Figaro in 1958, which toured 47 towns. From 1963 funding from the QE II Arts Council allowed national tours with a full orchestra, including a production of Porgy and Bess with a Māori cast including Īnia Te Wiata, and Ngaio Marsh's A Unicorn for Christmas with music by David Farquhar. After Arts Council funding was withdrawn in 1971 the company folded.

References

Sources 
 
 

New Zealand opera companies
Musical groups from Auckland
Musical groups established in 1954
Musical groups disestablished in 1971